Rubus nessensis is a species of bramble native to Northwestern Europe, including Great Britain and Ireland. Two subspecies are recognized: R. n. nessensis and R. n. cubirianus.

Description
Rubus nessensis is an erect, arching shrub growing to a height of 2 (rarely 3) metres. In its more usual shaded habitat, its stem is green; plants exposed to more light have brownish stems. Purple, conical prickles are numerous on the stem. Leaves bear 5 to 7 leaflets, the terminal leaflet being around 10 cm long, among the largest in the genus. The fruit is dark red, thus distinguishing Rubus nessensis  from other members of Rubus subgenus Rubus , except Rubus scissus, which lacks the conical prickles.

Habitat and distribution
Rubus nessensis is found in riverside woodland, where it can dominate the ground flora. It occurs widely across Northwestern Europe. In Great Britain it has a broad distribution, with strongholds along the south coast, in South Wales, and in Argyll. Most Irish records are from the eastern half of the country.

References

External links
 

Rubus